The Lutheran School For The Deaf is a special school for the deaf in Hong Kong founded by the Lutheran Church Hong Kong Synod. It provides primary and secondary education for the deaf. Students must be designated as having "severe hearing impairment" (hearing of both ears is impaired) to enroll with arrangement from the Education Bureau.

History 
The Lutheran School For The Deaf is founded in 1968. It was established on Cherry Street, Hong Kong. The school had to rent a part of Concordia Seminary in Yau Yat Tsuen due to insufficient classrooms for a time. In February 1990, a new campus in Kwai Chung finished construction. Both the primary and secondary department moved to the new campus.

In 2012, the school obtained 2,960,000HKD from the Quality Education Fund to carry out the Sign Assisted Instruction Programme from February 2012 to January 2015. In 2015, the school obtained 2,430,000HKD from the fund to continue the programme from February 2015 to July 2017.

Starting from the 2018/19 academic year, the school became the only school for the deaf providing primary and secondary education due to the disestablishment of Chun Tok School.

In January 2023, the school said that all students were required to learn the national anthem and planned to add a choral component to the song.

Academic structure 
Although the school is a special school, it follows the mainstream academic structure, providing six years of free primary education, four years of free junior secondary education, and three years of free senior secondary school. Students enroll in the Hong Kong Diploma of Secondary Education on third grade of senior secondary education. Courses are taught by teachers that have been trained in special education. Both verbal and sign language instruction are used during lessons.

Special education service

Deaf students support service 
The school has set up five centers located in Hong Kong Island, New Territories East, Kowloon, New Territories West, and Kwai Chung. They provide support services for deaf primary and secondary students in Hong Kong.

Speech therapy service 
Speech therapy service includes assessment, treatment, and counseling service for parents and teachers.

Hearing service 
Hearing services include hearing aid checking, cochlear implant checking, battery purchasing service, earmold checking, and hearing assessment.

Controversy 
The principal of the school, Xu Jiaen, is also an member of the executive committee of the Hong Kong Society for the Deaf (香港聾人福利促進會). There were deaf reporting there were three members in the committee violating the society constitution as their total term lengths are longer than the upper limit of 30 years, so they are not elected properly. They also said they were suppressed when questioning during member meetings. The society responded by saying that the society constitution did not impose restrictions on total term length so the members were elected properly, but did not elaborate much beyond that.

References

External links 
 Official website

Kwai Chung
Special schools in Hong Kong
Deaf education
1968 establishments in Hong Kong